Wilmington, the largest city in Delaware, is located at the Brandywine Creek and Christina River, which flows into the Delaware River. Wilmington is a major city of the Delaware Valley metropolitan area. Currently, Wilmington has 15 buildings that surpass 200 feet.

Tallest buildings 

These are the top 25 tallest buildings in Wilmington:

Timeline of tallest buildings in Wilmington

Here are the buildings that were once the tallest in Wilmington:

Tallest Under Construction

Here are the tallest buildings that are under construction in Wilmington:

Tallest proposed, canceled, and approved

Here are the tallest buildings that are proposed, canceled, or approved in Wilmington:

Tallest demolished

Here are the tallest buildings in Wilmington that were demolished:

See also
 List of tallest buildings in the United States
 List of tallest buildings by U.S. state
 Wilmington, Delaware

References

Emporis - 
Skyscraper Center - 
Skyscraper Page Diagrams - 
Google Earth - 

Tallest
Wilmington